The 2014–15 New Orleans Pelicans season is the 13th season of the franchise in the National Basketball Association (NBA). 
Despite finishing last in the Southwest division for the fourth straight season, the Pelicans finished with a 45–37 record and clinched the eighth seed in the Western conference. The Pelicans clinched a seed in the playoffs for the first time since 2011 when the team was called the Hornets. New Orleans' season ended after they were swept 4–0 in a first round playoff series by the eventual NBA champion Golden State Warriors.

The Pelicans would not return to the playoffs until 2018.

Preseason

Draft picks

The Pelicans did not have a pick in the 2014 NBA Draft.

Regular season

Standings

Game log

|- style="background:#cfc;"
| 1 
| October 28
| Orlando
| 
| Anthony Davis (26)
| Anthony Davis (17)
| Tyreke Evans (6)
| Smoothie King Center17,097
| 1–0

|- style="background:#fcc;"
| 2 
| November 1
| Dallas
| 
| Anthony Davis (31)
| Anthony Davis (15)
| Tyreke Evans (9)
| Smoothie King Center14,547
| 1–1
|- style="background:#fcc;"
| 3 
| November 3
| @ Memphis
| 
| Tyreke Evans (21)
| Ryan Anderson (9)
| Jrue Holiday (6)
| FedExForum15,302
| 1–2
|- style="background:#cfc;"
| 4 
| November 4
| Charlotte
| 
| Anthony Davis (24)
| Anthony Davis (13)
| Jrue Holiday (9)
| Smoothie King Center14,840
| 2–2
|- style="background:#cfc;"
| 5 
| November 8
| @ San Antonio
| 
| Anthony Davis (27)
| Anthony Davis (11)
| Jrue Holiday (11)
| AT&T Center18,581
| 3–2
|- style="background:#fcc;"
| 6 
| November 10
| @ Cleveland
| 
| Ryan Anderson (32)
| Anthony Davis (14)
| Jrue Holiday (10)
| Quicken Loans Arena20,562
| 3–3
|- style="background:#cfc;"
| 7 
| November 12
| L.A. Lakers
| 
| Anthony Davis (25)
| Ömer Aşık (13)
| Tyreke Evans (11)
| Smoothie King Center17,359
| 4–3
|- style="background:#cfc;"
| 8
| November 14
| Minnesota
| 
| Jrue Holiday (24)
| Evans & Anderson (6)
| Jrue Holiday (9)
| Smoothie King Center14,775
| 5–3
|- style="background:#fcc;"
| 9
| November 17
| @ Portland
| 
| Anthony Davis (31)
| Anthony Davis (11)
| Tyreke Evans (8)
| Moda Center19,441
| 5–4
|- style="background:#cfc;"
| 10
| November 18
| @ Sacramento
| 
| Anthony Davis (28)
| Anthony Davis (9)
| Jrue Holiday (9)
| Sleep Train Arena16,526
| 6–4
|- style="background:#fcc;"
| 11
| November 21
| @ Denver
| 
| Anthony Davis (18)
| Anthony Davis (9)
| Jrue Holiday (6)
| Pepsi Center15,232
| 6–5
|- style="background:#cfc;"
| 12
| November 22
| @ Utah
| 
| Anthony Davis (43)
| Anthony Davis (14)
| Jrue Holiday (9)
| EnergySolutions Arena18,452
| 7–5
|- style="background:#fcc;"
| 13
| November 25
| Sacramento
| 
| Tyreke Evans (22)
| Anthony Davis (9)
| Tyreke Evans (5)
| Smoothie King Center17,037
| 7–6
|- style="background:#fcc;"
| 14
| November 28
| @ Atlanta
| 
| Holiday & Anderson (20)
| Davis & Aşık (11)
| Jrue Holiday (7)
| Philips Arena17,079
| 7–7
|- style="background:#fcc;"
| 15
| November 29
| @ Washington
| 
| Anthony Davis (30)
| Anthony Davis (13)
| Tyreke Evans (4)
| Verizon Center17,581
| 7–8

|- style="background:#cfc;"
| 16
| December 2
| Oklahoma City
| 
| Tyreke Evans (30)
| Ömer Aşık (14)
| Jrue Holiday (10)
| Smoothie King Center13,903
| 8–8
|- style="background:#fcc;"
| 17
| December 4
| @ Golden State
| 
| Anthony Davis (30)
| Davis & Aşık (15)
| Jrue Holiday (8)
| Oracle Arena19,596
| 8–9
|- style="background:#fcc;"
| 18
| December 6
| @ L.A. Clippers
| 
| Anthony Davis (26)
| Ömer Aşık (10)
| Holiday, Mekel & Rivers (6)
| STAPLES Center19,060
| 8–10
|- style="background:#cfc;"
| 19
| December 7
| @ L.A. Lakers
| 
| Anthony Davis (23)
| Ömer Aşık (11)
| Jrue Holiday (8)
| STAPLES Center18,997
| 9–10
|- style="background:#cfc;"
| 20
| December 9
| New York
| 
| Tyreke Evans (27)
| Ömer Aşık (14)
| Jrue Holiday (7)
| Smoothie King Center13,789
| 10–10
|- style="background:#fcc;"
| 21
| December 10
| @ Dallas
| 
| Anthony Davis (31)
| Ömer Aşık (15)
| Jrue Holiday (10)
| American Airlines Center19,988
| 10–11
|- style="background:#cfc;"
| 22
| December 12
| Cleveland
| 
| Tyreke Evans (31)
| Ömer Aşık (14)
| Tyreke Evans (10)
| Smoothie King Center18,069
| 11–11
|- style="background:#fcc;"
| 23
| December 14
| Golden State
| 
| Tyreke Evans (34)
| Evans & Aşık (8)
| Jrue Holiday (9)
| Smoothie King Center15,037
| 11–12
|- style="background:#cfc;"
| 24
| December 16
| Utah
| 
| Anthony Davis (31)
| Anthony Davis (9)
| Jrue Holiday (8)
| Smoothie King Center13,179
| 12–12
|- style="background:#cfc;"
| 25
| December 18
| @ Houston
| 
| Anthony Davis (30)
| Anthony Davis (14)
| Jrue Holiday (10)
| Toyota Center18,317
| 13–12
|- style="background:#fcc;"
| 26
| December 20
| Portland
| 
| Austin Rivers (21)
| Alexis Ajinça (13)
| Jrue Holiday (6)
| Smoothie King Center16,079
| 13–13
|- style="background:#cfc;"
| 27
| December 21
| @ Oklahoma City
| 
| Anthony Davis (38)
| Davis & Aşık (12)
| Jrue Holiday (15)
| Chesapeake Energy Arena18,203
| 14–13
|- style="background:#fcc;"
| 28
| December 23
| @ Indiana
| 
| Anthony Davis (21)
| Tyreke Evans (10)
| Jrue Holiday (5)
| Bankers Life Fieldhouse17,336
| 14–14
|- style="background:#cfc;"
| 29
| December 26
| San Antonio
| 
| Davis & Anderson (22)
| Anthony Davis (21)
| Jrue Holiday (7)
| Smoothie King Center18,376
| 15–14
|- style="background:#fcc;"
| 30
| December 27
| @ Chicago
| 
| Anthony Davis (29)
| Anthony Davis (11)
| Jrue Holiday (7)
| United Center21,935
| 15–15
|- style="background:#cfc;"
| 31
| December 30
| Phoenix
| 
| Tyreke Evans (24)
| Anthony Davis (11)
| Jrue Holiday (6)
| Smoothie King Center16,364
| 16–15
|- style="background:#fcc;"
| 32
| December 31
| @ San Antonio
| 
| Anthony Davis (21)
| Davis & Aşık (12)
| Jrue Holiday (9)
| AT&T Center18,581
| 16–16

|- style="background:#cfc;"
| 33
| January 2
| Houston
| 
| Ryan Anderson (23)
| Ömer Aşık (11)
| Jrue Holiday (6)
| Smoothie King Center17,705
| 17–16
|- style="background:#fcc;"
| 34
| January 5
| Washington
| 
| Davis & Evans (21)
| Anthony Davis (10)
| Holiday & Gordon (6)
| Smoothie King Center16,182
| 17–17
|- style="background:#fcc;"
| 35
| January 7
| @ Charlotte
| 
| Anthony Davis (32)
| Anthony Davis (12)
| Jrue Holiday (9)
| Time Warner Cable Arena15,171
| 17–18
|- style="background:#cfc;"
| 36
| January 9
| Memphis
| 
| Jrue Holiday (23)
| Anthony Davis (10)
| Jrue Holiday (8)
| Smoothie King Center17,639
| 18–18
|- style="background:#fcc;"
| 37
| January 12
| @ Boston
| 
| Anthony Davis (34)
| Ömer Aşık (12)
| Anthony Davis (4)
| TD Garden16,905
| 18–19
|- style="background:#cfc;"
| 38
| January 14
| @ Detroit
| 
| Anthony Davis (27)
| Ömer Aşık (13)
| Tyreke Evans (9)
| Palace of Auburn Hills12,016
| 19–19
|- style="background:#fcc;"
| 39
| January 16
| @ Philadelphia
| 
|  Ajinça & Gordon (16)
| Ajinça & Aşık (14)
| Tyreke Evans (6)
| Wells Fargo Center15,672
| 19–20
|- style="background:#cfc;"
| 40
| January 18
| @ Toronto
| 
| Tyreke Evans (26)
| Ömer Aşık (9)
| Evans & Gordon (5)
| Air Canada Centre19,800
| 20–20
|- style="background:#fcc;"
| 41
| January 19
| @ New York
| 
| Tyreke Evans (23)
| Ömer Aşık (17)
| Eric Gordon (5)
| Madison Square Garden19,812
| 20–21
|- style="background:#cfc;"
| 42
| January 21
| L.A. Lakers
| 
| Anthony Davis (29)
| Ömer Aşık (10)
| Eric Gordon (10)
| Smoothie King Center16,268
| 21–21
|- style="background:#cfc;"
| 43
| January 23
| @ Minnesota
| 
| Anthony Davis (21)
| Anthony Davis (12)
| Tyreke Evans (8)
| Target Center14,978
| 22–21
|- style="background:#cfc;"
| 44
| January 25
| Dallas
| 
| Anthony Davis (28)
| Ömer Aşık (11)
| Tyreke Evans (12)
| Smoothie King Center17,687
| 23–21
|- style="background:#cfc;"
| 45
| January 26
| Philadelphia
| 
| Anthony Davis (32)
| Anthony Davis (10)
| Tyreke Evans (12)
| Smoothie King Center16,419
| 24–21
|- style="background:#fcc;"
| 46
| January 28
| Denver
| 
| Tyreke Evans (25)
| Davis & Aşık (12)
| Eric Gordon (6)
| Smoothie King Center16,055
| 24–22
|- style="background:#cfc;"
| 47
| January 30
| L.A. Clippers
| 
| Eric Gordon (28)
| Dante Cunningham (12)
| Tyreke Evans (12)
| Smoothie King Center17,932
| 25–22

|- style="background:#cfc;"
| 48
| February 2
| Atlanta
| 
| Anthony Davis (29)
| Ömer Aşık (17)
| Tyreke Evans (12)
| Smoothie King Center15,487
| 26–22
|- style="background:#fcc;"
| 49
| February 4
|  Oklahoma City
| 
| Anthony Davis (23)
| Anthony Davis (8)
| Evans & Gordon (7)
| Smoothie King Center17,156
| 26–23
|- style="background:#cfc;"
| 50
| February 6
| @ Oklahoma City
| 
| Anthony Davis (41)
| Davis & Evans (10)
| Tyreke Evans (16)
| Chesapeake Energy Arena18,203
| 27–23
|- style="background:#fcc;"
| 51
| February 7
| Chicago
| 
| Tyreke Evans (15)
| Ömer Aşık (7)
| Eric Gordon (4)
| Smoothie King Center18,402
| 27–24
|- style="background:#fcc;"
| 52
| February 9
| Utah
| 
| Eric Gordon (31)
| Ömer Aşık (8)
| Tyreke Evans (10)
| Smoothie King Center15,321
| 27–25
|- style="background:#fcc;"
| 53
| February 11
| Indiana
| 
| Luke Babbitt (15)
| Babbitt & Aşık (8)
| Tyreke Evans (6)
| Smoothie King Center17,074
| 27–26
|- align="center"
|colspan="9" bgcolor="#bbcaff"|All-Star Break
|- style="background:#fcc;"
| 54
| February 20
| @ Orlando
| 
| Tyreke Evans (14)
| Anthony Davis (11)
| Tyreke Evans (10)
| Amway Center18,259
| 27–27
|- style="background:#cfc;"
| 55
| February 21
| @ Miami
| 
| Eric Gordon (24)
| Ömer Aşık (9) 
| Gordon & Evans (6)
| American Airlines Arena19,982
| 28–27
|- style="background:#cfc;"
| 56
| February 23
| Toronto
| 
| Luke Babbitt (18)
| Ömer Aşık (11) 
| Tyreke Evans (12)
| Smoothie King Center16,514
| 29–27
|- style="background:#cfc;"
| 57
| February 25
| Brooklyn
| 
| Quincy Pondexter (25)
| Ömer Aşık (13) 
| Tyreke Evans (11)
| Smoothie King Center16,097
| 30–27
|- style="background:#cfc;"
| 58
| February 27
| Miami
| 
| Alexis Ajinça (24)
| Cunningham & Aşık (10)
| Tyreke Evans (11)
| Smoothie King Center17,797
| 31–27

|- style="background:#cfc;"
| 59
| March 1
| @ Denver
| 
| Tyreke Evans (22)
| Ömer Aşık (16)
| Tyreke Evans (7)
| Pepsi Center13,109
| 32–27
|- style="background:#fcc;"
| 60
| March 2
| @ Dallas
| 
| Norris Cole (19)
| Alexis Ajinça (12)
| Tyreke Evans (7)
| American Airlines Center20,367
| 32–28
|- style="background:#cfc;"
| 61
| March 4
| Detroit
| 
| Anthony Davis (39)
| Anthony Davis (13)
| Tyreke Evans (9)
| Smoothie King Center16,925
| 33–28
|- style="background:#fcc;"
| 62
| March 6
| Boston
| 
| Anthony Davis (29)
| Anthony Davis (14)
| Tyreke Evans (5)
| Smoothie King Center17,274
| 33–29
|- style="background:#cfc;"
| 63
| March 7
| Memphis
| 
| Tyreke Evans (26)
| Ömer Aşık (11)
| Pondexter & Evans (7)
| Smoothie King Center17,346
| 34–29
|- style="background:#cfc;"
| 64
| March 9
| @ Milwaukee
| 
| Anthony Davis (43)
| Anthony Davis (10)
| Davis & Evans (6)
| BMO Harris Bradley Center12,218
| 35–29
|- style="background:#cfc;"
| 65
| March 10
| @ Brooklyn
| 
| Pondexter & Ajinça (17)
| Ömer Aşık (15)
| Eric Gordon (7)
| Barclays Center16,422
| 36–29
|- style="background:#fcc;"
| 66
| March 15
| Denver
| 
| Anthony Davis (36)
| Anthony Davis (14) 
| Tyreke Evans (10)
| Smoothie King Center17,248
| 36–30
|- style="background:#cfc;"
| 67
| March 17
| Milwaukee
| 
| Anthony Davis (20)
| Anthony Davis (12)  
| Eric Gordon (7)
| Smoothie King Center17,881
| 37–30
|- style="background:#fcc;"
| 68
| March 19
| @ Phoenix
| 
| Eric Gordon (14)
| Ömer Aşık (14)
| Eric Gordon (5)
| US Airways Center18,055
| 37–31
|- style="background:#fcc;"
| 69
| March 20
| @ Golden State
| 
| Norris Cole (19)
| Withey & Ajinça (8)
| Cole & Evans (4)
| Oracle Arena19,596
| 37–32
|- style="background:#fcc;"
| 70
| March 22
| @ L.A. Clippers
| 
| Anthony Davis (26)
| Anthony Davis (12) 
| Davis & Gordon (5) 
| Staples Center19,299
| 37–33
|- style="background:#fcc;"
| 71
| March 25
| Houston
| 
| Tyreke Evans (28)
| Anthony Davis (14)
| Tyreke Evans (7)
| Smoothie King Center17,077
| 37–34
|- style="background:#cfc;"
| 72
| March 27
| Sacramento
| 
| Tyreke Evans (25)
| Ömer Aşık (12)
| Tyreke Evans (10)
| Smoothie King Center17,669
| 38–34
|- style="background:#cfc;"
| 73
| March 29
| Minnesota
| 
| Anthony Davis (28)
| Anthony Davis (9)
| Eric Gordon (7)
| Smoothie King Center17,576
| 39–34

|- style="background:#cfc;"
| 74
| April 1
| @ L.A. Lakers
| 
| Anthony Davis (20)
| Ömer Aşık (10)
| Tyreke Evans (8)
| Staples Center17,165
| 40–34
|- style="background:#cfc;"
| 75
| April 3
| @ Sacramento
| 
| Eric Gordon (21)
| Tyreke Evans (12)
| Tyreke Evans (9)
| Sleep Train Arena17,021
| 41–34
|- style="background:#fcc;"
| 76
| April 4
| @ Portland
| 
| Eric Gordon (22)
| Anthony Davis (9)
| Tyreke Evans (9)
| Moda Center19,781
| 41–35
|- style="background:#cfc;"
| 77
| April 7
| Golden State
| 
| Anthony Davis (29)
| Aşık & Davis (10)
| Tyreke Evans (9)
| Smoothie King Center18,097
| 42–35
|- style="background:#fcc;"
| 78
| April 8
| @ Memphis
| 
| Anthony Davis (12)
| Dante Cunningham (10)
| Evans & Gordon & Pondexter (3)
| FedExForum17,518
| 42–36
|- style="background:#cfc;"
| 79
| April 10
| Phoenix
| 
| Anthony Davis (19)
| Ömer Aşık (18)
| Cole & Evans (6)
| Smoothie King Center17,954
| 43–36
|- style="background:#fcc;"
| 80
| April 12
| @ Houston
| 
| Anthony Davis (27)
| Ömer Aşık (10) 
| Tyreke Evans (8)
| Toyota Center18,318
| 43–37
|- style="background:#cfc;"
| 81
| April 13
| @ Minnesota
| 
| Anthony Davis (24)
| Anthony Davis (11)
| Davis & Evans (5)
| Target Center13,009
| 44–37
|- style="background:#cfc;"
| 82
| April 15
| San Antonio
| 
| Anthony Davis (31)
| Anthony Davis (13)
| Tyreke Evans (11)
| Smoothie King Center18,524
| 45–37

Playoffs

Game log

|- style="background:#fbb;"
| 1
| April 18
| @ Golden State
| 
| Anthony Davis (35)
| Aşık & Pondexter (9)
| Cole & Pondexter (6) 
| Oracle Arena19,596
| 0–1
|- style="background:#fbb;"
| 2
| April 20
| @ Golden State
| 
| Anthony Davis (29)
| Ömer Aşık (14)
| Tyreke Evans (7)
| Oracle Arena19,596
| 0–2
|- style="background:#fbb;"
| 3
| April 23
| Golden State
| 
| Anthony Davis (29)
| Anthony Davis (15)
| Tyreke Evans (8) 
| Smoothie King Center18,444
| 0–3
|- style="background:#fbb;"
| 4
| April 25
| Golden State
| 
| Anthony Davis (36)
| Anthony Davis (11) 
| Gordon, Evans (5)
| Smoothie King Center18,443
| 0–4

Player statistics

Summer League

|-
|}

Preseason

|-
|}

Regular season

|-
|}

Injuries

Roster

Transactions

Trades

Free agents

Re-signed

Additions

Subtractions

Awards

References

External links
 2014–15 New Orleans Pelicans preseason at ESPN
 2014–15 New Orleans Pelicans regular season at ESPN

New Orleans Pelicans seasons
New Orleans Pelicans
2014 in sports in Louisiana
2015 in sports in Louisiana